Tadeusz Konkiewicz (28 August 1906 – 24 May 1956) was a Polish footballer. He played in one match for the Poland national football team in 1930.

References

External links
 

1906 births
1956 deaths
Polish footballers
Poland international footballers
Place of birth missing
Association footballers not categorized by position